Tujilane Rose Chizumila (born 14 May 1953) is a Malawian lawyer and jurist who was appointed to the African Court on Human and Peoples' Rights for a six-year term in  2017.

Early life and education
Chizumila was born on 14 May 1953 in Zomba, Malawi. Her father, George Michongwe, was a senior civil servant who was assigned to the Malawi Delegation at the United Nations in New York in 1964. After the Cabinet Crisis of 1964 in Malawi, the family fled into exile in 1966, settling as refugees in Tanzania. She has a bachelor's degree in law from the University of Dar es Salaam, and a master's degree in International Law, obtained in Germany.

Career
Chizumila and her two sons returned to Malawi in 1988, where she worked for Save the Children for eighteen months while waiting for a security clearance because she was the child of a "rebel." She was then directed by Hastings Banda to report to the Minister of Justice as a State Advocate. She was later the first woman to establish a law firm in Malawi.

In 2000, Chizumila was appointed as Malawi's High Commissioner to Zimbabwe. She was appointed as a judge of the High Court of Malawi in 2003 by President Bakili Muluzi. Her publication, "A widow's perspective - a personal experience" led to the enactment of a law making property grabbing an offence in Malawi.

Chizumila was Malawi's first female ombudsman, serving from 2010 until 2015. In 2012, she was accused of nepotism and was later arrested and interrogated in Lilongwe on suspicion of abuse of her office. She refused to resign when no evidence could be produced against her. In April 2013, five armed men raided her house in Lilongwe, stealing property and threatening her and her children.

Chizumila was elected to the African Court at the African Union meeting in Addis Ababa in January 2017, alongside Algerian Bensaoula Chafika. The two were sworn in on 6 March, bringing the number of women on the court to five of eleven judges for the first time and fulfilling the gender parity requirement of the Protocol establishing the court.

Publications

Personal life
Chizumila married in Tanzania and has two sons and a daughter. She divorced her husband for infidelity. In Malawi, she married Collins Chizumila, a pro-democracy advocate and founding member of the United Democratic Front who had served as Malawian Minister of Justice and Attorney General, in 1992. He died in 1996 and within three weeks she lost all property including her house which was sold by her stepson. Chizumila speaks English, German, Chichewa] English and [Swahili language|Swahili.

References

Living people
1953 births
People from Zomba District
University of Dar es Salaam alumni
Malawian women lawyers
High Commissioners of Malawi to Zimbabwe
Judges of the African Court on Human and Peoples' Rights
Malawian women diplomats
Women ambassadors
Malawian judges of international courts and tribunals
20th-century Malawian lawyers
21st-century Malawian judges